Sepharane is a small village in Limpopo province, South Africa. It's located to the east of National Road R503, settled near Witvinger Nature Reserve, its surrounded by Bakenburg which is also a nearby town.

Sepharane is home to the Northern Sotho speaking people. Whom migrated to this area around the early 1800's from the Boer Farms in the Waterberg region.

With mountains surrounding the village, it houses Gwangwa High School which was founded to bridge the distance for local school children who used to travel by foot to neighbouring high schools.

The community farms as well as has livestock consisting of Cattle, Sheep, Goats, Chickens and Pigs.

See also
Economy of South Africa
History of South Africa

References

Populated places in the Mogalakwena Local Municipality